NGC 1491 is a bright nebula in the constellation of Perseus. It is also known as LBN 704.

Gallery

References

External links 
 

Emission nebulae
Perseus (constellation)
1491
Star-forming regions
Sharpless objects